Let You Know may refer to:

 "Let You Know" (Flume song), released in 2019
 "Let You Know" (Hoobastank song), released in 2006
 "Let You Know" (Sketchy Bongo and Shekhinah song), released in 2016

See also
 "Did I Let You Know", a 2011 song by the Red Hot Chili Peppers
 "I'll Let You Know When I Get There", a 2011 episode of the American TV series The Killing
 Just to Let You Know..., 1993 debut album by Bitty McLean
 Things I Should Let You Know, 2013 album by Seth Glier